Because the Night is a crime fiction novel written by James Ellroy.

Released in 1984, it is the second installment of a trilogy that is either titled "Lloyd Hopkins Trilogy" after its main character, or "L.A Noir", after the hardcover omnibus that was released in 2006 containing all three books in the trilogy. 
Like Blood on the Moon (first book) and Suicide Hill (third and final book), it follows Lloyd Hopkins an LAPD robbery-homicide detective in the 1980s.

Plot summary
Because the Night features Hopkins investigating a triple murder at a liquor store. Nothing was stolen, leading Hopkins to suspect that the crime was a thrill killing. His investigation crosses paths with psychiatrist John Havilland, who uses drugs and professional expertise to manipulate a small group of followers into crime and debauchery.

References

1984 American novels
Novels by James Ellroy
Mysterious Press books